The Front Bar (formerly Friday Front Bar) is an Australian Football League-based talk show that airs on the Seven Network. The show is hosted by journalist Andy Maher and comedians Mick Molloy and Sam Pang.

Overview
The series, which typically airs from March to September during the AFL season, is produced by Front Bar Entertainment, a group operated by Molloy, with episodes generally featuring the hosts and special guests drinking beer as they discuss the week's topics in a light hearted way. To date, the guest pool has included Kevin Bartlett, Brian Taylor and Jason Dunstall. In 2019, they also welcomed Garry Lyon as a guest, which was significant since he had been a longtime co-host of The Footy Show, and in similar fashion later welcomed Billy Brownless as a guest in 2022.

In 2018, during the AFL offseason, the show made an edition of the show centered on the 2018 Winter Olympics in Pyeongchang. Later that same year, they also did specials that tied-in with the 2018 Commonwealth Games on the Gold Coast, and in November that year a Melbourne Cup edition of the show was broadcast ahead of the 2018 Melbourne Cup. In November 2019, two cricket-themed episodes aired ahead of the Australian cricket season, and this has continued on in the following years. Since 2022, an edition of the show covering and featuring guests from other sporting disciplines such as Mick Doohan, Lauren Jackson and Pat Rafter, titled The Front Bar: All Sports, has also aired prior to the AFL season.

Initially the show was sponsored by Carlton Draught beer until 2022; the show had received some criticism for being an extended advertisement for the brand. For 2023 the show signed a new deal with Furphy.

Hosts

Regular
 Andy Maher, journalist and Carlton supporter
 Mick Molloy, comedian and Richmond supporter
 Sam Pang, comedian and Carlton supporter

Semi-regular
 Andy Lee, comedian and Carlton supporter 
 Ryan Fitzgerald, retired Sydney and Adelaide player and Adelaide supporter
 Santo Cilauro, comedian, writer, filmmaker and Collingwood supporter
 Titus O’Reily, comedian, writer, broadcaster and Melbourne supporter
 Mark Knight, Herald Sun editorial cartoonist and AFL premiership poster creator
 Marty Sheargold, comedian and North Melbourne supporter
 Luke Darcy, Channel 7/Triple M commentator and Western Bulldogs supporter and retired player
 Matthew Richardson, Channel 7/3AW commentator and Richmond supporter and retired player

Broadcast history
The show launched as the Friday Front Bar in 2015 as an online-only show on the official AFL website, AFL.com.au; hosts Molloy and Maher had previously worked together on Before the Game. In 2016, the Seven Network picked up the show, with episodes being split into two versions, with snippets of the show being uploaded to AFL.com.au on Friday afternoon and the full version of the program airing after the Friday night match on the Seven Network in the traditional AFL states and on 7mate in New South Wales and Queensland. Episodes were filmed at the All Nations Hotel in Richmond in the first two seasons of the show.

In 2017, the show was renamed to The Front Bar and extended to a one-hour studio-based format airing on Thursday nights, occasionally airing after the Thursday night match when played during the season. In April, the show moved timeslots from 9:30pm to 8:30pm to go head-to-head with the Nine Network's long-running The Footy Show. The show consistently beat The Footy Show in the ratings beginning in the latter half of the 2017 season and continuing until Nine Network axed The Footy Show in 2019. In 2019, their Grand Final show was held at the Hotel Esplanade in St Kilda, and included AFL CEO Gillon McLachlan as a guest and Picket Palace as the house band.

In 2022, the show received its first Logie Awards nomination as it was nominated for the Logie Award for Most Popular Panel or Current Affairs Program.

See also

 List of Australian television series

References

External links
 
 

Seven Network original programming
2015 Australian television series debuts
Australian rules football television series
English-language television shows